Sir Laurence Woodward Martin  (30 July 1928 – 24 April 2022) was a British academic who was the vice-chancellor of Newcastle University from 1978 to 1990.

Life and career
Martin was born on 30 July 1928 in Cornwall. Educated at St Austell Grammar School, Christ's College, Cambridge and Yale University, Martin joined the Royal Air Force as a Flying Officer in 1948. He married Betty Parnall in 1956 with whom he had two children.

Martin became Dean of the Faculty of Social Sciences at the University of Wales in 1966, and was appointed Professor of War Studies at King's College, London in 1968, Vice-Chancellor of Newcastle University in 1978 and Director of the Royal Institute of International Affairs in 1991. In 1981 he gave the Reith Lectures on the theme The Two-Edged Sword. He was appointed Deputy Lieutenant of Tyne and Wear in 1987. He was knighted in 1994.

Martin died on 24 April 2022, at the age of 93.

Works
Considerations affecting an extension of the test ban, 1966

References

1928 births
2022 deaths
Military personnel from Cornwall
Knights Bachelor
Deputy Lieutenants of Tyne and Wear
Alumni of Christ's College, Cambridge
Academics of King's College London
Fellows of King's College London
Royal Air Force officers
Yale University alumni
Vice-Chancellors of Newcastle University
People educated at St Austell Grammar School